PSO J352.4034–15.3373, or PJ352-15, is a quasar with an astrophysical jet ascribed to a billion-solar-mass supermassive black hole. Its discovery, using the Chandra X-Ray Observatory, was reported in March 2021. At 12.7 billion light years from Earth, the X-ray jet became an observational distance record at the time of its discovery.

See also
 List of the most distant astronomical objects
 List of quasars

References

Quasars
Supermassive black holes
Astronomical objects discovered in 2021
Aquarius (constellation)